Northern Tasmanian, or Tommeginne (Tommeeginnee), is an aboriginal language of Tasmania in the reconstruction of Claire Bowern.

Northern Tasmanian is attested from word lists collected on Flinders Island by Joseph Milligan and published in 1857 & 1859. One, labeled "northwest tribes", contains 268 words; the other, labeled "western tribes", contains 369.

References

Northern Tasmanian languages
Languages extinct in the 19th century